Pholidocarpus is a genus of flowering plant in the family Arecaceae, native to Southeast Asia. 
It contains the following species:

 Pholidocarpus ihur (Giseke) Blume - Sulawesi, Maluku
 Pholidocarpus kingianus (Becc.) Ridl. - Peninsular Malaysia
 Pholidocarpus macrocarpus Becc. - Peninsular Malaysia, Thailand, Sumatra
 Pholidocarpus majadum Becc. - Borneo
 Pholidocarpus mucronatus Becc. - Sumatra
 Pholidocarpus sumatranus Becc. - Sumatra

References

 
Flora of Thailand
Flora of Malesia
Arecaceae genera
Taxonomy articles created by Polbot